Cristina Curto (born 21 June 1969) is a Spanish judoka. She competed at the 1992 Summer Olympics and the 1996 Summer Olympics.

References

External links
 

1969 births
Living people
Spanish female judoka
Olympic judoka of Spain
Judoka at the 1992 Summer Olympics
Judoka at the 1996 Summer Olympics
Sportspeople from Barcelona
20th-century Spanish women